The 1941 Baylor Bears football team represented Baylor University in the Southwest Conference (SWC) during the 1941 college football season. In their first season under head coach Frank Kimbrough, the Bears compiled a 3–6–1 record (1–4–1 against conference opponents), finished in sixth place in the conference, and were outscored by opponents by a combined total of 161 to 106. They played their home games at Waco Stadium in Waco, Texas. Jack W.Wilson was the team captain.

Schedule

References

Baylor
Baylor Bears football seasons
Baylor Bears football